The 1970 Oakland Raiders season was the team's 11th season in Oakland. It was also their first season as members of the NFL. The Raiders would ultimately win their fourth consecutive division title (as well as their first AFC West title). They advanced to the AFC Championship Game, where they lost to the Baltimore Colts.

The Raiders' 1970 season is best remembered for a series of clutch performances by veteran placekicker/quarterback George Blanda. Blanda, despite being cut during the 1970 preseason, eventually re-joined the Raiders' roster. His ensuing season (the twenty-first of his professional career) would rank as one of the more dramatic comebacks in sports history. Over a span of five consecutive games, Blanda would come off the bench to spark a series of dramatic rallies. The Raiders went an impressive 4–0–1 over this span.

Blanda's five-game "streak" began on October 25, 1970. In a home game against the Pittsburgh Steelers, Blanda threw for two touchdowns in relief of an injured Daryle Lamonica. One week later, his 48-yard field goal (with three seconds remaining on the clock) salvaged a 17–17 tie with the defending Super Bowl Champion Kansas City Chiefs. One week later, on November 8, Blanda would come off the bench against the Cleveland Browns. His late touchdown pass (with 1:34 remaining in the game) tied the game at 20–20. He would ultimately kick a 53-yard field goal, as time expired, to give the Raiders a stunning 23–20 victory. The following week, against the Denver Broncos, Blanda again replaced Lamonica in the fourth quarter. His touchdown pass to Fred Biletnikoff, with 2:28 left in the game, gave the Raiders an unlikely 24–19 win. The incredible streak concluded one week later against the San Diego Chargers. The Raiders managed to drive deep into Chargers territory in the game's final seconds. Blanda's last-minute 16-yard field goal would seal a dramatic 20–17 triumph.

Blanda's streak played a huge role in the Raiders' 1970 division title, as the team went a mediocre 4–4–1 in "non-streak" games. Indeed, their final record of 8–4–2 (itself a four-win drop from a 12–1–1 finish in 1969) placed them only one game ahead of the Chiefs at season's end.

The Raiders would ultimately advance to the 1970 AFC Championship Game, where they met the heavily favored 11–2–1 Baltimore Colts. During this game, Blanda again came off the bench in relief of an injured Lamonica. Blanda's solid play (17 of 32 passes for 217 yards, two touchdowns, and a 48-yard field goal) kept the Raiders in the game until the final quarter, when he was intercepted twice. At age 43, Blanda became the oldest quarterback to ever play in a championship game.

Blanda's eye-opening achievements resulted in his winning the Bert Bell Award. Chiefs' owner Lamar Hunt quipped that "...this George Blanda is as good as his father, who used to play for Houston."  While he never again played a major role at quarterback, Blanda would serve as the Raiders' kicker for five more seasons.

Offseason

Draft

Roster

Regular season

Schedule

Game summaries

Week 1 at Bengals

Week 2 at Chargers

Week 3 at Dolphins

Week 4 vs Broncos

Week 5

Week 6

Week 7 at Chiefs

Ben Davidson speared Len Dawson causing a massive brawl between the two teams.

Week 8

Standings

Playoffs

AFC Divisional Playoffs

AFC Championship Game

Awards and honors
 George Blanda, Associated Press Athlete of the Year
 George Blanda, Bert Bell Award

References

 Raiders on Pro Football Reference
 Raiders on Database Football

Oakland
Oakland Raiders seasons
AFC West championship seasons
Oakland